Wamanmarka or Waman Marka (Quechua waman falcon, marka village, Hispanicized spelling Huamanmarca) is a pre-Hispanic archaeological site in the Lima Region of Peru. It was declared a National Cultural Heritage by Resolución Directoral Nacional No. 326/INC on October 30, 1997.

References 

Archaeological sites in Peru
Archaeological sites in Lima Region